Lasiopogon cinctus  is a Palearctic species of robber fly in the family Asilidae.

References

External links
Geller Grim Robberflies of Germany
Images representing Lasiopogon cinctus

Brachyceran flies of Europe
Asilidae
Insects described in 1781